Gad was a seer or prophet mentioned in the Hebrew Bible and the writings of Jewish historian Josephus. He was one of the personal prophets of King David of Israel and, according to the Talmudic tradition, some of his writings are believed to be included in the Books of Samuel. He is first mentioned in  telling David to return from refuge in Moab to the forest of Hereth in the land of Judah.

The next biblical reference to Gad is  where, after David confesses his sin of taking a census of the people of Israel and Judah, God sends Gad to David to offer him a choice of three forms of punishment.

The place indicated by Gad for the altar is "in the threshing-floor of Araunah the Jebusite".

 tells of an encounter Gad had with the angel of the Lord.

A tomb attributed to Gad is located at Halhul.

The Chronicles of Gad the seer

References

11th-century BCE Hebrew people
Angelic visionaries